Saïd Sayah (born July 21, 1989 in Oran) is an Algerian football player who is currently playing as a midfielder for ASM Oran in the Algerian Ligue Professionnelle 2.

Club career
On July 27, 2011, Sayah was loaned out to MC Saïda for one season.

Statistics

References

External links
 DZFoot Profile
 
 USM-Alger.com Profile

1989 births
Living people
Algerian footballers
Algeria under-23 international footballers
Footballers from Oran
USM Alger players
MC Oran players
MC Saïda players
Algerian Ligue Professionnelle 1 players
Algeria youth international footballers
Association football midfielders
21st-century Algerian people